Zellertal is a municipality in the Donnersbergkreis district, in Rhineland-Palatinate, Germany.

Zellertal is in Zellertal region, which in turn is part of the Palatinate wine region and borders on the Rhenish Hesse wine region.

Economy
The local economy is based on viticulture and tourism related to viticulture.  See Rhineland-Palatinate for a further description of the local viticulture.

References

External links
 Guide to businesses in the Zellertal region 

Donnersbergkreis